Godfrey Ssuubi Kiwanda is a Ugandan politician. He was the State Minister for Tourism in the Ugandan Cabinet.  He was appointed to that position on 6 June 2016. He concurrently serves as the elected representative of Mityana County North, Mityana District in the 10th Ugandan Parliament (2016–2021).

Background and education
Kiwanda was born in present-day Mityana District, on 1 August 1973. He attended St. Joseph Busunju Primary School, obtaining the Primary Leaving Certificate in 1989. He transferred to	St. Francis Senior Secondary School, Busunju where he completed both middle and high school. He received his High School Diploma in 1996. He continued his studies at Makerere University, Uganda's oldest and largest public university, graduating in 2000 with a Bachelor of Arts degree.

Career
Kiwanda was first elected to Uganda's parliament in 2001, representing Mityana North Constituency, serving in that capacity until 2006. From 2007 until 2010, he served as the Resident District Commissioner (RDC) of Kaabong District, in the Karamoja sub-region.

In 2011, he bounced back into parliament on the National Resistance Movement (NRM) political party ticket. He was re-elected in 2016. In June of that year, he was appointed as State Minister for Tourism in the Cabinet of Uganda.

Other considerations
During the run-up to the 2021 presidential and parliamentary elections, Godfrey Kiwanda withdrew his name from the 2021 parliamentary race in his constituency, just before the NRM party primaries in August 2020. That left Muhamad Kibedi Nsegumire, as the sole NRM representative in the upcoming 14 January 2021 general election.

Kiwanda was instead elected by the Central Executive Committee (CEC), the supreme organ of the NRM, as the Party's Vice President for Uganda's Central Region for the term 2021 to 2026.

See also
 Cabinet of Uganda
 Parliament of Uganda

References

External links
 Website of the Parliament of Uganda

Living people
1973 births
Ganda people
Mityana District
People from Mityana District
Members of the Parliament of Uganda
Government ministers of Uganda
Central Region, Uganda
Makerere University alumni
21st-century Ugandan politicians